Manganese germanide (MnGe) is an intermetallic compound, a germanide of manganese. Its crystals have a cubic symmetry with no inversion center, they are therefore helical, with right-hand and left-handed chiralities.

Magnetism

At low temperatures, MnGe and its relative MnSi exhibit unusual spatial arrangements of electron spin, which were named magnetic skyrmion, tetrahedral and cubic hedgehog lattices. Their structure can be controlled not only by the Si/Ge ratio, but also by temperature and magnetic field. This property has potential application in ultrahigh-density magnetic storage devices.

Synthesis
MnGe crystals can be produced by processing a mixture of Mn and Ge powders at a pressure of 4–5 GPa and a temperature of 600–1000 °C for 1–3 hours. They are metastable and decompose into Mn11Ge8 and Ge upon subsequent heating to 600 °C at ambient pressure.

Structure
Manganese germanide is a non-stoichiometric compound where the Ge:Mn ratio often deviates from 1. The Mn3Ge5 compound is a Nowotny phase exhibiting a chimney ladder structure. It is either a semimetal or a narrow-gap semiconductor.

References

Manganese compounds
Germanides
Iron monosilicide structure type